This is a list of diplomatic missions of Samoa. The Pacific state of Samoa has a very limited number of diplomatic missions, complemented by several honorary consulates (not shown). Samoan embassies were opened in China and Japan in January 2009.

America

 Pago Pago, American Samoa (Consulate-General)

Asia

 Beijing (Embassy)

 Tokyo (Embassy)

Europe

 Brussels (Embassy)

Oceania

 Canberra (High Commission)
 Sydney (Consulate-General)

 Suva (High Commission)

 Wellington (High Commission)
 Auckland (Consulate-General)

Multilateral organisations
 
New York City (Permanent Mission)
Geneva (Permanent Mission)

Gallery

See also
 Foreign relations of Samoa
 List of diplomatic missions in Samoa

References

External links
 Ministry of Foreign Affairs and Trade
 Details of diplomatic missions of Samoa

Diplomatic Missions of Samoa
Diplomatic missions
Samoa